Pavel Gerasimovich  Lisitsian (November 6, 1911 – July 6, 2004), was a Soviet baritone opera singer who performed in the Bolshoi Opera, Moscow from 1940 until his retirement from stage in 1966.

Biography 
He was born into an Armenian family living in the Russian city of Vladikavkaz, where his father was a mineworker. Pavel first worked in diamond drilling, then as a welder apprentice hoping to follow his father's steps. He first began to sing in a church choir before moving to Leningrad to study cello (1930).

As a strong-voiced soloist of a local amateur group he was commissioned to the Leningrad Conservatory.

He started his vocal career in the Maly Leningrad State Opera Theatre and then in the Yerevan Opera House, where he performed the leads for three years.

From 1940 to 1966, Pavel Lisitsian was the soloist of the Bolshoi Theatre and performed parts of Yeletsky, Onegin, Mazepa, and Robert (in Tchaikovsky’s The Queen of Spades, Evgenie Onegin, Mazepa, and Iolanta respectively), Germont and Amonasro (in Verdi's Traviata and Aida), Escamilo (in Bizet’s Carmen), Tatul (Spendiarov’s Almast), Arsaces II (Arshak II) (Chuhadzhyan's Arshak II), Napoleon (in Prokofiev's War and Peace), and others.

During a concert tour of the US in 1960, he appeared at the Metropolitan Opera as Amonasro. He died in Moscow art age 92.

His daughters Karina and Ruzanna are successful opera singers who frequently perform together. His grand daughter pianist Elena Lisitsian lives in New York City and his grandson Paul Asoyan lives in Encinitas, California.

Sources
  Biography
 Horst Seeger, Opernlexikon, 4th ed. 1989, Henschelverlag Kunst und Gesellschaft Berlin, GDR,  
Oxford Music Online, Alan Blyth: "Lisitsyan, Pavel Gerasim" 

1911 births
2004 deaths
People from Vladikavkaz
People from Terek Oblast
Russian people of Armenian descent
Soviet male opera singers
Operatic baritones
People's Artists of the USSR
Ethnic Armenian male singers